The 1902–1903 season was Manchester City F.C.'s twelfth season of league football and 1st season back in the Second Division of the Football League. Managing an immediate promotion, the club gained their second minor league trophy in their then-short history.

Football League Second Division

Results summary

Reports

FA Cup

Squad statistics

Squad
Appearances for competitive matches only

Scorers

All (incl. abandoned)

League

FA Cup

Abandoned

See also
Manchester City F.C. seasons

References

External links
Extensive Manchester City statistics site

1902-03
English football clubs 1902–03 season